Wang Qiang may refer to:

Sportspeople
Wang Qiang (footballer) (born 1984), Chinese association footballer
Wang Qiang (wrestler) (born 1987), Chinese freestyle wrestler
Wang Qiang (martial artist) (born 1989), Chinese kick boxer
Wang Qiang (tennis) (born 1992), Chinese tennis player
Wang Qiang (skier) (born 1993), Chinese cross-country skier
Wang Qiang (judoka) (born 1991), Chinese judoka

Other
Wang Zhaojun (1st century BC), also known as Wang Qiang, ancient Chinese beauty
Wang Qiang (composer) (born 1935), Chinese composer
Wang Qiang (calligrapher) (born 1959), Chinese calligrapher and professor
Wang Qiang (serial killer) (1975–2005), Chinese serial killer
Wang Qiang (general) (born 1963), Air Force general of the People's Liberation Army.

See also
Wang (surname)